Le Havre Seine Métropole is the communauté urbaine, an intercommunal structure, centred on the city of Le Havre. It is located in the Seine-Maritime department, in the Normandy region, northwestern France. It was created on 1 January 2019 by the merger of the former Agglomeration community of Le Havre and the communautés de communes Canton de Criquetot-l'Esneval and Caux Estuaire. Its area is 495.8 km2. Its population was 268,912 in 2018, of which 169,733 in Le Havre proper.

Composition
The communauté urbaine consists of the following 54 communes:

Angerville-l'Orcher
Anglesqueville-l'Esneval
Beaurepaire
Bénouville
Bordeaux-Saint-Clair
Cauville-sur-Mer
La Cerlangue
Criquetot-l'Esneval
Cuverville
Épouville
Épretot
Étainhus
Étretat
Fongueusemare
Fontaine-la-Mallet
Fontenay
Gainneville
Gommerville
Gonfreville-l'Orcher
Gonneville-la-Mallet
Graimbouville
Harfleur
Le Havre
Hermeville
Heuqueville
Manéglise
Mannevillette
Montivilliers
Notre-Dame-du-Bec
Octeville-sur-Mer
Oudalle
Pierrefiques
La Poterie-Cap-d'Antifer
La Remuée
Rogerville
Rolleville
Sainneville
Saint-Aubin-Routot
Sainte-Adresse
Sainte-Marie-au-Bosc
Saint-Gilles-de-la-Neuville
Saint-Jouin-Bruneval
Saint-Laurent-de-Brèvedent
Saint-Martin-du-Bec
Saint-Martin-du-Manoir
Saint-Romain-de-Colbosc
Saint-Vigor-d'Ymonville
Saint-Vincent-Cramesnil
Sandouville
Le Tilleul
Les Trois-Pierres
Turretot
Vergetot
Villainville

Organization

Elected members 
The communauté urbaine is administered by its conseil communautaire, composed of 130 municipal councilors representing the 54 members communes distributed by municipal population as follows:

List of presidents

References

Havre
Havre
Le Havre